William Aloysius "King" Brady (August 18, 1889 – April 10, 1956) was a former Major League Baseball pitcher. He played one game with the Boston Braves on July 9, 1912, giving up two hits and throwing for one scoreless inning to end the game.

References

External links

Boston Braves players
Major League Baseball pitchers
1889 births
1956 deaths
Baseball players from New York City
Fort Worth Panthers players
Galveston Sand Crabs players
Toledo Mud Hens players
Indianapolis Indians players
Burials at Calvary Cemetery (Queens)
Warren Bingoes players